"Ghetto Girls" is a hip hop song by Lil' Bow Wow It is the fourth and final single from his debut album Beware of Dog (2000). It features background vocals by Jermaine Dupri and Jagged Edge (American group). The song uses a sample of "All in My Mind" by R&B group Soul for Real.

Music video
The video premiered on 106 & Park on March 1, 2001. It features cameos by B2K, Da Brat, Wingo and Kyle of Jagged Edge, Eve and Jermaine Dupri.

Charts

References

2001 singles
Bow Wow (rapper) songs
Music videos directed by Bryan Barber
Song recordings produced by Jermaine Dupri
Songs written by Bryan-Michael Cox
Songs written by Jermaine Dupri
So So Def Recordings singles
2000 songs